The 2020 Pacific hurricane season was the least active Pacific hurricane season since 2011. The season was near average in terms of tropical storms, featuring a total of 17, but had a well below average number of hurricanes and major hurricanes, with only 4 hurricanes and 3 major hurricanes forming including one unnamed tropical storm which was operationally classified as a tropical depression, the first such occurrence since 2001. Despite this, it featured the earliest start to a season east of 140°W on record, with Tropical Depression One-E forming on April 25. The season officially began on May 15 in the East Pacific Ocean, and on June 1 in the Central Pacific and they both ended on November 30. These dates conventionally delimit the period of each year when most tropical cyclones form in the Pacific basin. However, the formation of tropical cyclones is possible at any time of the year, as shown by the record-early formation of Tropical Depression One-E.

The most significant storms of the season were Tropical Storm Amanda and Hurricane Genevieve. Amanda developed near Central America in late May and struck Guatemala, causing widespread damage in neighboring El Salvador and killing 40 people amid the COVID-19 pandemic in the latter country. Genevieve passed closely to the tip of the Baja California Peninsula in August, bringing hurricane-force winds and heavy rainfall, killing six and causing an estimated $50 million in damage. Otherwise, impact from other storms was minimal. In late July, Hurricane Douglas made an extremely close pass to Hawaii, with its weak southern eyewall crossing Oahu, causing minor effects. The remnant moisture of Tropical Storm Fausto brought dry thunderstorms and lightning to Northern California, sparking hundreds of fires that contributed to the state's worst fire season in recorded history, and the remnants of Genevieve dropped heavy rainfall in Arizona and Southern California. Tropical Storm Hernan moved very near the coast of Mexico and made landfall in Baja California Sur as a tropical depression, causing an additional fatality. The final storm of the season, Tropical Storm Polo, dissipated on November 19, about 11 days before the official end of the season. Collectively, the tropical cyclones of this season caused about US$250 million in damage and 47 deaths.


Seasonal forecasts 

On May 20, 2020, the Servicio Meteorológico Nacional (SMN) issued its forecast for the season, predicting a total of 15–18 named storms, 8–10 hurricanes, and 4–5 major hurricanes to develop. The next day, the National Oceanic and Atmospheric Administration (NOAA) issued their outlook, calling for a below-normal to near-normal season with 11–18 named storms, 5–10 hurricanes, 1–5 major hurricanes, and an accumulated cyclone energy index of 60% to 135% of the median. Factors they expected to reduce activity were near- or below-average sea surface temperatures across the eastern Pacific and the El Niño–Southern Oscillation remaining in the neutral phase, with the possibility of a La Niña developing.

Seasonal summary

Although the hurricane season in the eastern Pacific did not officially begin until May 15, and on June 1 in the central Pacific, activity this year began several weeks prior with the formation of Tropical Depression One-E on April 25. This marked the earliest formation of a tropical cyclone in the basin, surpassing 2017's Tropical Storm Adrian. Among relatively unfavorable conditions, the depression soon dissipated without developing further, and activity would not resume in the basin until nearly a month later with the formation of Tropical Depression Two-E near the coast of Guatemala on May 30. This system would later become Tropical Storm Amanda, the first named storm of the season and one of the worst natural disasters in El Salvador in around two decades. Not for nearly another month after Amanda, Tropical Depression Three-E would briefly become Tropical Storm Boris on June 25 well out to sea before weakening in the Central Pacific basin. A short-lived tropical depression would form near Baja California Sur just 2 days after Boris's dissipation and quickly weaken. Activity continued as yet another tropical depression, Six-E, formed on July 13 but quickly dissipated among the unfavorable conditions unfolding in the basin. Two more tropical systems formed in mid July, Tropical Depression Seven-E and Tropical Storm Douglas. Seven-E was short lived and although it did gain tropical storm intensity, it was operationally left unnamed. Douglas strengthened into the first hurricane of the season at 15:00 UTC on July 22, marking the fourth–latest date any season had gone without a hurricane. Douglas would later strengthen into a Category 4 hurricane and brush Hawaii with rain and gusty winds.

A burst of activity occurred in early August, with a tropical wave south of Mexico evolving into Tropical Storm Elida on August 9, later to become the second hurricane of the season. Elida was generally short lived, but with the formation of Tropical Depression Ten-E, Tropical Storm Fausto, and Hurricane Genevieve activity continued. Genevieve later became the second major hurricane of the season before briefly effecting Baja California Sur as a minimal hurricane. Two additional tropical cyclones, Tropical Storms Hernan and Iselle, formed in late August. Both were generally weak and did not make landfall, although the former brought heavy flooding and mudslides to western Mexico. Later, on September 5, the remnants of former Atlantic tropical cyclone Nana reformed into a new cyclone in the Pacific named Julio. After Julio, Karina and Lowell formed. Near the end of September, Hurricane Marie formed and rapidly intensified up to Category 4 strength before weakening out to sea, becoming the strongest storm of the season. The only October storm of the season, Norbert, lasted for 10 days. After almost a month of inactivity, Odalys formed on November 3, and dissipated three days later without affecting land. Tropical Storm Polo formed close to the end of the season, but it was also short-lived and weak.

The Accumulated Cyclone Energy (ACE) index for the 2020 Pacific hurricane season (Eastern Pacific and Central Pacific combined) as calculated by Colorado State University using data from the National Hurricane Center was 77.3 units. Broadly speaking, ACE is a measure of the power of a tropical or subtropical storm multiplied by the length of time it existed.

Systems

Tropical Depression One-E

A disturbance developed within the Intertropical Convergence Zone (ITCZ) on April 17, aided by the passage of a convectively-coupled kelvin wave (CCKW) – an eastward-propagating area of enhanced thunderstorm activity near the equator. Moving northwestward, the depression retained organized deep convection until shortly after 00:00 UTC the next day. Dry air and westerly wind shear caused the depression to weaken and degenerate to a remnant low by 12:00 UTC. The remnant low turned west and opened up into a trough at 18:00 UTC on April 27.

Tropical Storm Amanda

The combination of an upper-level low over northeastern Mexico and a passing CCKW over the East Pacific caused an area of low pressure to form south of Guatemala and El Salvador on May 27. Two days later, the system interacted with a tropical wave that first originated from Africa on May 18. Moving northeastward around the periphery of a large cyclonic gyre over northern Central America, the compact depression continued to organize, strengthening into Tropical Storm Amanda at 06:00 UTC the next day. About four hours later, Amanda made landfall at peak intensity near Las Lisas, Santa Rosa. Amanda rapidly degenerated as it moved inland, with its center dissipating around 18:00 UTC. The remnants of the system moved northward into the Bay of Campeche and redeveloped into the Atlantic's Tropical Storm Cristobal.

In El Salvador, torrential rainfall caused significant damage along coastal cities in the country as rivers overflowed and swept away buildings. Amanda killed 14 people in El Salvador, of which at least six died due to flash flooding, and one died from a collapsed home. More than 900 homes were damaged across the country and 1,200 families were evacuated to 51 shelters across La Libertad, San Salvador, Sonsonate, and San Vicente. In the capital, San Salvador, 50 houses were destroyed and 23 vehicles fell into a sinkhole. El Salvador President Nayib Bukele declared a 15-day national state of emergency due to the storm. Movement restrictions in place for the ongoing COVID-19 pandemic were temporarily lifted to allow people to purchase medicines, while hardware stores were allowed to open with limited capacity so people could purchase equipment for repairs.

Tropical Storm Boris

The interaction between a tropical wave, a preexisting area of disturbed weather, and the favorable phase of the Madden-Julian Oscillation (MJO) led to the formation of a surface low late on June 23. Deep convection coalesced with this circulation over the ensuing hours, and a tropical depression developed around 06:00 UTC on June 24. The system struggled via the effects of nearby dry air and some wind shear as it moved west to west-northwest under the subtropical ridge. Nonetheless, it intensified into Tropical Storm Boris around 18:00 UTC on June 25 when deep convection was most prevalent. A further increase in upper-level winds prevented Boris from strengthening beyond minimal tropical storm intensity, and it instead weakened to a tropical depression again twelve hours later before crossing into the Central Pacific basin. All associated thunderstorm activity dissipated by June 28, and Boris degenerated to a remnant area of low pressure by 00:00 UTC that day. The post-tropical cyclone curved west-southwest and dissipated well south-southeast of the Hawaiian Islands on June 30.

Tropical Depression Four-E

A broad area of disturbed weather, at least partially enhanced by a tropical wave, formed near the Gulf of Tehuantepec on June 25. The system paralleled the Mexican coastline and only slowly organized over the coming days, eventually meeting the criteria to be designated a tropical depression around 18:00 UTC on June 29. Despite coalescing deeper convection near the center at the time of formation, Tropical Depression Four-E failed to attain winds greater than 30 mph (45 km/h) as it encountered hostile southwesterly wind shear and colder ocean waters. Instead, the system degenerated to a remnant area of low pressure by 18:00 UTC on June 30. The low turned north and dissipated well south of Baja California on July 1.

Tropical Storm Cristina

A tropical wave emerged off the west coast of Africa on June 20 and crossed into the East Pacific on July 3, where it interacted with the monsoon trough and began to organize. This system developed a defined surface low on July 6 and was classified as a tropical depression about 435 mi (705 km) south of Acapulco, Guerrero. Steered along a northwest trajectory by a mid-level ridge, the depression traversed a region of favorable conditions which enabled slow intensification. Initial predictions from the NHC suggested significant strengthening of the cyclone. However, Cristina instead encountered cooler waters and eventually drier air; it reached its peak intensity late on July 10 with winds of 70 mph (110 km/h) as it passed west of Socorro Island. Thereafter, the cyclone turned west along the south side of the subtropical ridge and steady weakened. The storm degraded into a remnant low around 18:00 UTC on July 12 and degenerated into a trough on July 15 about halfway between Hawaii and Baja California Sur.

Tropical Depression Six-E

A tropical wave, emerging off Africa on July 2, fractured over the western Atlantic several days later. The southern wave axis continued into the eastern Pacific, where its interaction with the monsoon trough resulted in the formation of an area of low pressure. This low failed to organize for a few days as it was hindered by strong northeasterly wind shear, and indeed it briefly opened up into a trough. On July 13, a burst of extremely deep convection led to the redevelopment of a new circulation, and the system organized into a tropical depression around 12:00 UTC that day. As the cyclone moved west-northwest away from Mexico, its associated convection waned, preventing the system from intensifying to a tropical storm. Instead, Tropical Depression Six-E dissipated into an open trough once again around 18:00 UTC on July 14.

Tropical Storm Seven-E

A tropical wave left Africa on July 6 and emerged into the East Pacific on July 13. It moved west and steadily coalesced despite an environment of cool ocean waters and dry air. At 00:00 UTC on July 20, the disturbance organized into a tropical depression. In real time, the depression was not assessed to have intensified further. However, a post-season review of satellite wind data revealed that it briefly became a 40 mph (65 km/h) tropical storm around the time it displayed a well-defined rainband in its western quadrant. This peak in intensity was short-lived as the system became devoid of deep convection; by 06:00 UTC on July 21, Seven-E degenerated to a remnant low. The low then spun down and dissipated by 00:00 UTC on July 22.

Hurricane Douglas

Douglas originated from a tropical wave that departed Africa on July 8. It reached the East Pacific on July 15, where environmental conditions fostered its development into a tropical depression at 00:00 UTC on July 20 about 805 mi (1,295 km) southwest of Baja California Sur. It strengthened into Tropical Storm Douglas eighteen hours later, and though it suffered a brief dry air intrusion, the storm further organized into a hurricane by 18:00 UTC on July 22. A period of rapid intensification was underway at this point, and over a 30-hour period, its winds increased to 130 mph (215 km/h) on July 24. Shortly thereafter, the hurricane crossed into the Central Pacific on a course toward Hawaii. Cooler ocean waters led to gradual weakening of the hurricane as it approached the state. On July 27, the center of Douglas passed just 60 mi (95 km) north of Oahu; despite its proximity, effects were negligible. Increasing wind shear caused the hurricane to rapidly unfold on July 28, resulting in its degradation to a remnant low at 12:00 UTC the next day well to the southeast of Midway Atoll. The low opened up into a trough just west of the International Date Line on July 30.

Hurricane Elida

A tropical wave emerged off Africa on July 26 and split over the Caribbean several days later, with the southern portion of the wave continuing into the eastern Pacific. A small low developed in association with this wave, eventually organizing into a tropical depression by 18:00 UTC on August 8. Twelve hours later, the depression intensified into Tropical Storm Elida while paralleling the coastline of Mexico. Owing to favorable environmental conditions, Elida intensified steadily on August 9 and then rapidly the following day, attaining hurricane strength around 18:00 UTC on August 10. An eye developed within the storm's compact and symmetrical central dense overcast, and Elida reached peak winds of 105 mph (165 km/h) by 12:00 UTC the next morning. Ultimately, the influence of dry air and cooler waters caused the storm to swiftly weaken, and it degenerated to a remnant area of low pressure by 00:00 UTC on August 13 while positioned west of Baja California Sur. The low turned north before opening up into a trough a little over 24 hours later.

Tropical Depression Ten-E

An area of disturbed weather formed within the monsoon trough southwest of Baja California on August 11. It moved west and gradually organized, becoming a tropical depression at 06:00 UTC on August 13 while located over the open East Pacific. The system tracked over warm ocean waters, but it was persistently hindered by strong northeasterly wind shear. Thus, it maintained peak winds of 35 mph (55 km/h) and failed to ever become a tropical storm. The depression moved erratically as ridging to its north weakened. After a few days of producing intermittent convection, the system degenerated to a remnant low around 12:00 UTC on August 16. It opened up into a trough the next day.

Tropical Storm Fausto 

A tropical wave entered the East Pacific on August 9 and spawned the development of a tropical depression around 00:00 UTC on August 16, despite ongoing easterly wind shear. The depression intensified into Tropical Storm Fausto six hours later, but it was immediately stripped of its convection and thus fell back to a tropical depression only six hours after earning a name. Fausto curved toward the west and moved over colder waters, which further enabled its weakening. The system degenerated to a remnant low around 12:00 UTC on August 17, far away from land. The low moved west and opened up into a trough about a day later.

A large plume of moisture brought northwards by Fausto generated massive thunderstorms across a large portion of Northern California, beginning on August 16. These storms produced mostly dry lightning with little to no rain, with almost 11,000 lightning strikes occurring in the state between August 16 and 17. The lightning from these storms sparked 367 fires across the state, several of which became very large in a short period of time, threatening thousands of structures and forcing thousands of people to evacuate. The massive SCU Lightning Complex, August Complex, CZU Lightning Complex, and North Complex fires were connected to the thunderstorms associated with Fausto.

Hurricane Genevieve

Favorable environmental conditions supported its rapid development while it moved northwest parallel to Mexico. It intensified into Tropical Storm Genevieve at 18:00 UTC on August 16 and became a hurricane around 12:00 UTC the next morning. Within the ensuing 24-hour period, Genevieve's maximum winds increased from 75 mph (120 km/h) to 130 mph (215 km/h), equivalent to a Category 4 hurricane, as it harbored a well-defined eye on satellite imagery. A weakening trend began almost immediately as the storm faced higher southwesterly wind shear and a track over colder waters left by Tropical Storm Elida. The system curved north for a time, nearly moving onshore Baja California Sur before it bent back northwest. This track over colder waters caused Genevieve to lose convection and degenerate to a remnant low around 18:00 UTC on August 21. It dissipated a little under a day later.

Isolated rainfall totals around  overspread Oaxaca and Guerrero, and a storm-peak accumulation of  occurred at Cabo San Lucas. Resultant flooding caused some damage to hydraulic, highway, and electrical systems throughout Baja California Sur; total damage topped $50 million. Six people were killed: two via landslides and two via swollen rivers in Oaxaca, plus two from drownings at the resort of Los Cabos in Baja California Sur.

Tropical Storm Hernan

The favorable phase of the MJO moved across the East Pacific, enhancing the monsoon trough and spawning an area of disturbed weather. Three areas of low pressure formed along this trough, with the first one developing into Tropical Storm Hernan around 06:00 UTC on August 26. Broad in nature and under the influence of easterly wind shear, Hernan attained peak winds of 45 mph (75 km/h) on August 27 but began to rapidly weaken the next day as it moved north just offshore the Mexico coastline. It degenerated to a remnant low at 18:00 UTC on August 28. The low curved west around a broad circulation that contained the developing Tropical Storm Iselle before being absorbed by that feature later in the day.

In Mexico, 97,000 customers lost electricity. Hernan dropped precipitation amounts of 5-9 inches (127–228 mm) of rainfall from Michoacán to Nayarit, causing flash flooding and mudslides in the Mexican states of Jalisco and Colima. It prompted many families to flee their homes. At least 400 people were evacuated in Jalisco, and 18 people stuck on their roof in the state had to be rescued. In Cihuatlán, roughly 365 residents evacuated into shelters. A sinkhole shut down a portion of Mexican Federal Highway 80 between Santa Cruz and San Patricio, a mudslide closed down another part of the freeway near Lázaro Cárdenas. The Cuixmala River overflowed its banks, causing parts of Mexican Federal Highway 200 to shut down. The town of La Manzanilla was mostly inundated by floodwaters which caused a bridge near the town to collapse. Several schools were damaged by Hernan in the state of Colima. In Tamala, a parota tree fell on a road, blocking traffic. In Manzanillo, some homes and streets were damaged and covered with mud. In Nayarit, a mudslide occurred on a hill behind a populated neighborhood in Xalisco, however, no damage has been reported from this incident. Despite Hernan weakening into a tropical depression before landfall in Baja California Sur, local weather services in the area advised residents to take extreme precautions.

Tropical Storm Iselle

Within the broad cyclonic circulation across Central America and adjacent waters, a westward-moving tropical wave spawned an area of low pressure on August 23. This low, originally weak and ill-defined, was enhanced by a CCKW two days later. Following increased organization, it became a tropical depression around 12:00 UTC on August 26 while positioned well southwest of Baja California Sur. The depression strengthened into Tropical Storm Iselle six hours later. The newly formed system encountered strong east-northeasterly wind shear, but the effects of this shear were offset by strong diffluence that aided in deep convection. Iselle reached peak winds of 60 mph (95 km/h) early on August 28 when it displayed semblance of a mid-level eye on microwave imagery. As the cyclone moved north-northeast, though, it encountered a more hostile environment and began to weaken. The system degenerated to a remnant low at 18:00 UTC on August 30, and that low dissipated 24 hours later just offshore Baja California Sur.

Tropical Storm Julio

On September 3, the Atlantic's Hurricane Nana made landfall in southern Belize. It crossed Mexico over the next day, with its low-level center dissipating but its mid-level remnants continuing into the East Pacific. Plentiful convection spawned a new circulation and yielded tropical storm-force winds, resulting in the designation of Tropical Storm Julio about 85 mi (140 km) southwest of Puerto Angel, Oaxaca, at 00:00 UTC on September 5. The new storm moved unusually quick toward the west-northwest and reached peak winds of 45 mph (75 km/h) on September 6 when a concentrated burst of thunderstorms developed over its center. An uptick in easterly wind shear prevented additional development, and Julio instead opened up into a trough around 06:00 UTC on September 7. The next day, its remnants were absorbed by a broad area of low pressure southwest of Socorro Island.

Tropical Storm Karina

A tropical wave departed Africa on August 26 and emerged into the East Pacific by September 7, where it only slowly developed. The system moved west-northwest on the southwest side of a ridge throughout its duration. In the wake of its formation, the depression struggled with northeasterly wind shear which kept the center exposed. Despite this, it intensified into Tropical Storm Karina around 06:00 UTC on September 13. Shear decreased the following day, allowing Karina to attain peak winds of 60 mph (95 km/h) on September 15. Ocean waters eventually began to decrease, causing a weakening trend that resulted in Karina's degeneration to a remnant low at 18:00 UTC on September 16. The low turned west and opened up into a trough early on September 18.

Tropical Storm Lowell

A trough developed south of the Atlantic's Tropical Storm Beta on September 28, stretching from the southwestern Gulf of Mexico into the East Pacific. A disturbance formed on the southern end of this trough, eventually organizing into a tropical depression at 18:00 UTC on September 20. Hostile wind shear initially prevented the depression from intensifying, but it lessened somewhat on September 21, allowing the system to become Tropical Storm Lowell around 18:00 UTC that day. Lowell attained peak winds of 50 mph (85 km/h) on September 23, but it began to weaken later that day while encountering stronger wind shear and cooler ocean waters. Deep convection was gradually stripped from the cyclone's center, and Lowell degenerated to a remnant low at 18:00 UTC on September 25. The low moved west and opened up into a trough on September 28 well east of the Big Island.

Hurricane Marie

A tropical wave interacted with the monsoon trough south of Mexico and an overarching CCKW, resulting in a broad disturbance on September 24. Twelve hours later, it became Tropical Storm Marie. The nascent storm moved through an environment of warm ocean waters, abundant moisture, and decreasing northeasterly wind shear which facilitated its rapid organization. Marie became a hurricane at 00:00 UTC on October 1; within 30 hours, it reached its peak as a Category 4 hurricane with winds of 140 mph (220 km/h). Marie displayed a well-defined eye surrounded by cloud tops as cool as  around this time. Inner core processes modulated Marie's strength for a time, but it eventually crossed into cooler waters, drier air, and higher southwesterly wind shear. These factors caused it to degenerate to a remnant low by 18:00 UTC on October 6. A brief burst of convection nudged the low northward on October 7, but the cyclone curved west-southwest and opened up into a trough three days later, just after crossing into the Central Pacific.

Tropical Storm Norbert

A tropical wave left Africa on September 19 and moved over Central America on September 29. The system moved northwest and it intensified amid favorable environmental conditions. Spiral banding increased near the center, signaling its intensification to Tropical Storm Norbert twelve hours after formation. Norbert attained peak winds of 60 mph (95 km/h) on October 6, but it encountered drier air and increasing westerly wind shear. Convection burst intermittently over subsequent days, but the cyclone weakened as it underwent a cyclonic loop. Around 00:00 UTC on October 10, the system opened up into a trough south of Manzanillo.

The remnants of Norbert moved generally northwest and continued to face unfavorable wind shear. However, sporadic bursts of convection led to a new mid-level center and eventually a surface one as well. These features aligned, and thunderstorm activity increased, leading to Norbert's redesignation as a tropical depression near 18:00 UTC on October 13. It regained tropical storm status and reached a secondary peak of 45 mph (75 km/h) on October 14. Just as its previous stint as a tropical cyclone, though, the cyclone encountered hostile conditions and began to weaken. It degenerated to a remnant low near 00:00 UTC on October 15 and dissipated less than 12 hours later to the west of Baja California Sur.

Tropical Storm Odalys

A tropical wave passed over Central America and entered the Eastern Pacific basin on October 29. Its associated thunderstorm activity remained relatively disorganized until November 1, when a broad area of low pressure developed within the system. By 18:00 UTC on November 3, the NHC determined the system was sufficiently organized to be designated Tropical Storm Odalys while it was centered about 730 mi (1,175 km) southwest of Baja California Sur. Odalys intensified somewhat over the next few days while moving west-northwest despite strong wind shear and dry air impinging on the system. At 00:00 UTC on November 5, the system reached its peak intensity with winds of 50 mph (85 km/h). Wind shear increased further shortly afterwards, causing Odalys to weaken quickly and eventually become a post-tropical cyclone at 18:00 UTC on November 5. Its shallow remnants turned southwest under the influence of a strong high-pressure area and dissipated by November 8.

Tropical Storm Polo

The season's final storm developed from an area of convection within the monsoon trough that may have been enhanced by a Gulf of Tehuantepec gap wind event over preceding days. On November 14, a broad area of low pressure formed. Both the low and associated thunderstorm activity gained cohesion over the coming days, resulting in the formation of a tropical depression around 18:00 UTC on November 17 to the southwest of Baja California Sur. The depression intensified into Tropical Storm Polo six hours later and reached peak winds of 45 mph (75 km/h) the following morning. As the system moved west-northwest, it encountered an increasingly hostile environment, and Polo weakened to a tropical depression early on November 19. By 18:00 UTC that day, the cyclone degenerated to a remnant area of low pressure that moved west and then west-southwest prior to dissipating into an open trough on November 21.

Storm names

The following names were used for named storms that formed in the northeastern Pacific Ocean during 2020. This is the same list used in the 2014 season, with the exception of the name Odalys, which replaced Odile. The name Odalys was used for the first time this year. No names were retired from this list, so all will be used again in the 2026 season.

For storms that form in the Central Pacific Hurricane Center's area of responsibility, encompassing the area between 140 degrees west and the International Date Line, all names are used in a series of four rotating lists. The next four names that were slated for use in 2020 are shown below. However, none of them were used.

Season effects
This is a table of all the storms that formed in the 2020 Pacific hurricane season. It includes their duration, names, areas affected, damages, and death totals. Deaths in parentheses are additional and indirect (an example of an indirect death would be a traffic accident), but were still related to that storm. Damage and deaths include totals while the storm was extratropical, a tropical wave, or a low, and all the damage figures are in 2020 USD.

See also

 Tropical cyclones in 2020
 List of Pacific hurricanes
 Pacific hurricane season
 2020 Atlantic hurricane season
 2020 Pacific typhoon season
 2020 North Indian Ocean cyclone season
 South-West Indian Ocean cyclone seasons: 2019–20, 2020–21
 Australian region cyclone seasons: 2019–20, 2020–21
 South Pacific cyclone seasons: 2019–20, 2020–21

Notes

References

External links

National Hurricane Center Website
National Hurricane Center's Eastern Pacific Tropical Weather Outlook
Servicio Meteorológico Nacional Website 
Joint Typhoon Warning Center 
NHC 2020 Pacific hurricane season archive

 
Pacific hurricane seasons
Tropical cyclones in 2020